This is a list of Singapore’s electoral divisions which were existence during the period of 1948 to 1951, demarcated for the purpose of conducting the first election in Singapore in 1948. There were only four electoral districts, of which two are for two seats for a total of six elected members into the Legislative Council.

External links 
Map of electoral divisions

1948-1951